The 1958–59 Southern Football League season was the 56th in the history of the league, an English football competition.

It was the first season since 1936 the league split into two divisions following the election of thirteen new clubs at the end of the previous season. Hereford United won the North-West Division, whilst Bedford Town won the South-East Division. Bedford were declared Southern League champions after defeating Hereford 2–1 in a championship play-off at Edgar Street on 9 May. Nine clubs applied to join the Football League, although none were successful.

The plan for the following season was to have a Premier Division of 22 clubs and a Division One below it. As a result, the top eleven clubs in each division this season would remain in the new Premier Division, whilst clubs finishing twelfth or lower would be in the new Division One.

North-West Division
It was the first and the only North-West Division season. North-West Division consisted of 18 clubs, including 11 Southern League clubs from the previous season and seven new clubs:
Three clubs from the Birmingham & District League:
Burton Albion
Nuneaton Borough
Rugby Town

One club from the Cheshire League:
Wellington Town

Three clubs from the Midland League:
Boston United 
Corby Town
Wisbech Town

At the end of the season Southern League divisions were restructured. The top eleven clubs in each division this season remained in the new Premier Division, whilst clubs finishing twelfth or lower relegated to the new Division One. Lovells Athletic left the league and switched to the Welsh football pyramid.

League table

South-East Division
It was the first and the only South-East Division season. South-East Division consisted of 17 clubs, including 11 Southern League clubs from the previous season and six new clubs:
Cambridge City, from the Athenian League
Cambridge United, from the Eastern Counties League
Clacton Town, from the Eastern Counties League
King's Lynn, from the Midland League
Trowbridge Town, from the Western League
Yiewsley, from the Corinthian League

At the end of the season Southern League divisions were restructured. The top eleven clubs in each division this season remained in the new Premier Division, whilst clubs finishing twelfth or lower relegated to the new Division One.

League table

Football League election
Nine Southern League clubs applied to join the Football League. However, all four League clubs were re-elected.

References

Southern Football League seasons
S